Penkhull is a district of the city of Stoke-on-Trent, Staffordshire, England, part of Penkhull and Stoke electoral ward, and Stoke Central parliamentary constituency.

Penkhull is a conservation area, and includes Grade II listed buildings such as the church and Greyhound Inn public house.

History
The Victoria History of the County of Stafford: Volume 8 (1965) suggests that name arises from the British pencet ('end or head of the wood') and the Old English hyll (hill). Ward (1843) also mentioned the possibility of the Celtic British Pen (head) and Kyl (kiln).  The idea of a 'head' or 'end' is topographically apt, since the village is sited on the elevated end of a long strip of valley-side woodland which begins at the ancient Bradwell Wood five miles to the north.

The early origins date from 2500 BC, and there have been three archaeological finds from this period. A study by the local city Council stated of Penkhull that... "it has held a settlement for over four thousand years".

The Domesday Book records it as two hides of land in the Hundred of Pirehill and that it was held by Earl Algar.

Penkhull was a Royal Manor from the time of William the Conqueror 1086, and the last record of its title as a Royal Manor was in 1308 under King (Edward II).

Penkhull was developed by Josiah Spode II as a dormitory suburb of Stoke-upon-Trent, the town from which the city of Stoke-on-Trent took its name.

The Church

The ecclesiastical parish was created out of the parish of Stoke in 1844 when the church of St. Thomas was built. The church is by Scott and Moffatt.  The Revd Thomas Webb Minton, the son of Thomas Minton and Rector of Darlington, gave the sum of £2,000 to be invested from which the interest provided an income for the Vicar. The aisles were added in 1892 by Edward Prioleau Warren.  The Village Hall was built at the same time and was at that time a Church of England school for the poor.

Music and Performing Arts

Penkhull has a number of music and performing arts events, including annual Mystery Plays and community pantomime.

Notable people

 Thomas Whieldon (1719 in Penkhull - 1795) significant English potter who played a leading role in the development of the Staffordshire Potteries
 Josiah Spode II (1755–1827) built the large residential hall 'The Mount', and many properties for the employees who worked at his factory in the town of Stoke.
Sir Oliver Joseph Lodge FRS (1851 in Penkhull – 1940) British physicist  and writer involved in the development of radio and sparking plugs. He identified electromagnetic radiation. He was a Christian Spiritualist
 Professor Alfred Lodge MA (1854 in Penkhull – 1937), English mathematician, author, and the first president of the Mathematical Association
Sir Richard Lodge (1855 in Penkhull – 1936) British historian and was Professor of History at the University of Glasgow from 1894-1899 and then Professor of History at the University of Edinburgh from 1899 to 1925
 Edward Prioleau Warren (1856 – 1937) British architect and archaeologist. In 1892 he worked on the addition of aisles at St Thomas's Church, Penkhull
 Eleanor Constance Lodge CBE, (1869 - 1936). Vice-Principal of Lady Margaret Hall, Oxford from 1890 to 1921 and then Principal of Westfield College, Hampstead, in the University of London from 1921 to 1931
 John Wain (1925-1994) Poet, novelist, playwright, biographer, critic, academic. He spent his childhood at Bromley Hough, Penkhull. 
 Charles Tomlinson, CBE (1927 in Penkhull– 2015) British poet, translator, academic and illustrator. He grew up in Basford
 Neil Morrissey (born 1962) English actor, voice actor, singer, comedian, and businessman. He spent much of his childhood in Penkhull Children's Home and attended Thistley Hough High School.

Sport 
 Reg Forester (1892 in Penkhull – 1959) English footballer who played for Stoke City F.C. and Macclesfield Town F.C.
Sir Stanley Matthews (1915 – 2000) the only footballer to be knighted while still playing. He moved to "The Views" Penkhull (also birthplace of Sir Oliver Lodge) in 1989 where lived until his death in 2000.
 John Poole (born 1932) English former football goalkeeper who made 33 league appearances for Port Vale F.C. between 1953 and 1961.
 Bill Bratt MBE (born 1945) former chairman of Port Vale F. C., from 2003 to 2011. He lived in numerous children's homes in Penkhull, before becoming a miner at Chatterley Whitfield
 Peter Ridgway (born 1972 in Penkhull) cricketer, a left-handed batsman who bowled right-arm fast-medium

References

External links

 Penkhull Residents Association Website

Areas of Stoke-on-Trent